The 2015 Ukrainian Amateur Cup season was scheduled to start on August 12, 2015.

The cup holders FC Inhulets-2 Petrove (AF Pyatykhatska) were defeated by FC Balkany Zorya in quarterfinals.

Participated clubs

 Cherkasy Oblast (2): Retro Vatutine, Zoria-Cherkaskyi Dnipro-2
 Chernihiv Oblast: Yednist Plysky
 Chernivtsi Oblast (2): Zarinok Tysovets, FC Voloka
 Khmelnytskyi Oblast (2): Hetman Khmelnytsky, Zbruch Volochysk
 Kherson Oblast (2): Kolos Khlibodarivka, Avanhard Kakhovka
 Kirovohrad Oblast: Inhulets-2 Petrove
 Kyiv Oblast: FC Obukhiv
 Lviv Oblast (5): Rukh Vynnyky, Opir Lviv, SCC Demnya, Hirnyk Sosnivka, FC Mykolaiv
 Mykolaiv Oblast: FC Vradiyivka

 Odesa Oblast (2): Zhemchuzhyna Odesa, Balkany Zorya
 Poltava Oblast: Olimpia Savyntsi
 Rivne Oblast (3): Mayak Sarny, FC Malynsk, ODEK Orzhiv
 Sumy Oblast: Ahrobiznes TSC Romny
 Ternopil Oblast (2): Nyva Terebovlia, Ahro Synkiv
 Vinnytsia Oblast (3): FC Vinnytsia, 15 Hromada Rudanske, Patriot Kukavka
 Zhytomyr Oblast (2): Mal Korosten, SC Korosten
 Zaporizhia Oblast: Tavriya-Skif Rozdol

Competition schedule

Qualification round

|}

Round of 16
All games were played on 2 and 9 September 2015, except for the second leg of Demnya-Hirnyk was played on 16 September.

|}

Quarterfinals

|}

Semifinals

|}

Final

|}

See also
 2015 Ukrainian Football Amateur League

Notes

References

External links
 Official website of the Football Amateur Association
 Shatskikh scores for Rukh and other games of Round of 32 of the Ukrainian Cup among amateurs. UA-Football. 12 August 2015.
 Second leg of Round of 32 of the 2015 Ukrainian Cup among amateurs. UA-Football. 19 August 2015.
 There were defined participants of Round of 16 of the Ukrainian Cup among amateurs. UA-Football. 26 August 2015.
 Results of the first leg of Round of 16 of the Ukrainian Cup among amateurs. UA-Football. 2 September 2015
 There were defined quarterfinals participants of the 2015 Ukrainian Cup among amateurs. UA-Football. 10 September 2015
 Results of the first leg of quarterfinals of the Ukrainian Cup among amateurs. UA-Football. 1 October 2015

Ukrainian Amateur Cup
Ukrainian Amateur Cup
Amateur Cup